Zsombor Veress (born 24 December 1999) is a Romanian professional footballer of Hungarian ethnicity who plays as a forward.

References

External links
 
 
 

1999 births
Living people
Romanian footballers
Romanian expatriate footballers
Romanian people of Hungarian descent
Association football forwards
Liga I players
Liga II players
Sepsi OSK Sfântu Gheorghe players
Romanian expatriate sportspeople in Hungary
Expatriate footballers in Hungary